Virpazar is a village in the municipality of Bar, Montenegro.

Overview
It is located in the Crmnica region, straddling the Crmnica river, which flows into nearby Skadar Lake. There are various tourist facilities including Virpazar hotel, a lakeshore hotel.

There is a station on the Belgrade–Bar railway and a road leaves the main Podgorica to Bar highway and follows the western shore of the lake towards Albania.

Demographics
According to the 2011 census, its population was 277.

Gallery

References

Populated places in Bar Municipality